Šidlauskas is a Lithuanian language family name. It may refer to:
Andrius Šidlauskas (footballer), footballer
Andrius Šidlauskas (swimmer), swimmer
Rimantas Šidlauskas, diplomat
Odeta Šidlauskaitė, athlete

Lithuanian-language surnames
Occupational surnames